Shen Baozhen (1820–1879), formerly romanized , was an official during the Qing dynasty.

Biography
Born in Minhou in Fujian province, he obtained the highest degree in the imperial examinations in 1847 and was soon appointed to the Hanlin Academy.

His great administrative abilities attracted the attention of Zeng Guofan, who enlisted him in the effort to suppress the Taiping Rebellion.

Following the suppression of the rebellion in 1864, Shen became actively involved in the Self-strengthening movement and later worked on the Foochow Arsenal in Fuzhou. Concurrently, he also improved the land tax collection system in Jiangxi province.

He also took part in obtaining a peace settlement with Japan, following the Mudan Incident and Japan's invasion of Taiwan in response to imperial disavowals of sovereignty over the islands' native tribes. He was appointed as the Viceroy of Liangjiang in 1875. He personally visited Taiwan and reformed its administration. Shen elevated 2 prefectures, 4 subprefectures, and 4 counties, making the territories smaller and easier to administer. He also launched a military campaign against the aborigines and initiated a building program in southern Taiwan intended to establish a stronger Qing presence and prevent Japanese or European colonization of the area. He died in office in 1879. He was posthumously awarded the title of Senior Guardian of the Heir Apparent. 

He is chiefly remembered in European histories for his belated opposition to the Woosung Road Company's railroad, which he purchased and dismantled in its first year of operation, limiting Shanghai's development for twenty years. Shanghai remained unconnected to China's growing rail network until the line's reconstruction in 1898 and its subsequent extension to Nanjing in 1908.

Shen was married to Lin Puqing  1821–77), the third daughter of Lin Zexu.  She exhibited great courage and determined tenacity when under siege by the Taiping rebels at Guangxin when she bandaged troops, cooked for them and cut her finger to write a message in blood.

References

Citations

Bibliography

Pong, David. Shen Pao-Chen and China's Modernization in the Nineteenth Century. Cambridge and New York: Cambridge University Press, 1994.
Shen, Richard.  'The Yellow Riding Jacket' Xlibris, 2008

Qing dynasty generals
Qing dynasty politicians from Fujian
1820 births
1879 deaths
Politicians from Fuzhou
Political office-holders in Jiangsu
Generals from Fujian
Viceroys of Liangjiang